Supreme Allied Commander is the title held by the most senior commander within certain multinational military alliances. It originated as a term used by the Allies during World War I, and is currently used only within NATO for Supreme Allied Commander Europe and Supreme Allied Commander Transformation.

Historical titles

World War I
On 26 March 1918, the French marshal Ferdinand Foch was appointed Supreme Allied Commander, gaining command of all Allied forces everywhere, and coordinated the British, French, American, and Italian armies to stop the German spring offensive, the last large offensive of the German Empire. He was the one who accepted the German cessation of hostilities in his private train.

On 14 April 1918, at his own request, Foch was appointed, "Commander in Chief of the Allied Armies".  Despite his promotion 19 days earlier, and the subsequent Beauvais Conference of 3 April 1918, he was not provided a title. He remedied this by making up his own title and by writing to Prime Minister Clemenceau to request it, which was immediately granted.  This is important because the Doullens Conference of 26 March was kept a secret until 30 March, and still not known to most of the army once it was published.

World War II

During World War II, the Allied leaders appointed Supreme Allied Commanders to manage the multi-nation, multi-discipline fighting forces for a particular theatre of war.  These Supreme Allied Commanders were given operational control over all air, land, and sea units in that theatre. In other cases, senior commanders were given the title Commander-in-Chief.

These Supreme Allied Commanders were drawn from the most senior leaders in the British Armed Forces and United States Armed Forces. These commanders reported to the British/American Combined Chiefs of Staff, although in the case of the Pacific and South East Asia, the relevant national command authorities of the American Joint Chiefs of Staff or the British Chiefs of Staff Committee had responsibility for the main conduct of the war in the theatre, depending on the Supreme Commander's nationality.

General of the United States' Army Dwight D. Eisenhower served in successive Supreme Allied Commander roles.  Eisenhower was the Commander-in-Chief, Allied Force for the Mediterranean theatre.  Eisenhower then served as Supreme Commander Allied Expeditionary Force (SCAEF) in the European theatre, starting in December 1943 with the creation of the command to execute Operation Overlord and ending in July 1945 shortly after the End of World War II in Europe.   In 1951, Eisenhower would again be a Supreme Allied Commander, the first to hold the post for NATO (see next section).

Field Marshal Henry Maitland Wilson succeeded Eisenhower in the Mediterranean theatre, given the title Supreme Allied Commander Mediterranean. Wilson was succeeded by Field Marshal Harold Alexander, who continued in charge of those Allied forces until the end of the war.

Admiral of the Fleet Lord Louis Mountbatten was Supreme Allied Commander South East Asia (SACSEA) throughout most of its existence. He replaced General Archibald Wavell.

Generalissimo Chiang Kai-shek was named the Supreme Commander of Allied forces in the China war zone (CBI) on 1942. However, US forces in practice were usually overseen by General Joseph Stilwell, the Deputy Allied Commander in China and South East Asia Command (SEAC). Until late 1944 that the land forces chain of command was clarified, after Stilwell was recalled to Washington. His overall role, and the CBI command were then split among three people: Lt Gen. Raymond Wheeler became Deputy Supreme Allied Commander South East Asia; Maj. Gen. Albert Wedemeyer became Chief of Staff to Chiang, and commander of US Forces, China Theater (USFCT). Lt Gen. Daniel Sultan was promoted, from deputy commander of CBI to commander of US Forces, India-Burma Theater (USFIBT) and commander of the NCAC.

General of the Army Douglas MacArthur was appointed Supreme Allied Commander, South West Pacific Area (SWPA) on 18 April 1942. However, he preferred to use the title Commander-in-Chief. During the Allied occupation of Japan following the war, MacArthur held the title of Supreme Commander for the Allied Powers (SCAP). The Pacific Ocean Areas (POA), divided into the Central Pacific Area, the North Pacific Area and the South Pacific Area, were commanded by Admiral Chester W. Nimitz, Commander-in-Chief Pacific Ocean Areas.

Although not bearing any official title of Supreme Allied Commander, the commanders of the 1st Belorussian, 1st, 2nd, 3rd and 4th Ukrainian Fronts of the Soviet Red Army - Zhukov, Rokossovsky, Konev, Malinovsky, Tolbukhin, Sokolovsky, Yeremenko, Petrov, Vatutin, etc. - acted in de facto capacity of Supreme Allied Commanders in that units of foreign Allied armies were incorporated into the fronts' order of battle and fought against the European Axis powers under their command during the Great Patriotic War: The Polish Armed Forces in the East, 1st Czechoslovak Army Corps, French Normandie-Niemen Fighter Regiment and Romanian Tudor Vladimirescu Division from 1943 onwards, then from 1944 onwards until the end of the war the Romanian Army, Bulgarian Army and Yugoslav National Liberation Army.

After the end of the Soviet Union's European theater of World War II, during the Soviet-Japanese War, the commanders of the Red Army's 1st and 2nd Far Eastern fronts and Transbaikal Front - Vasilevsky (in overall command of all three fronts), Malinovsky, Meretskov and Purkayev - once again acted in de facto capacity of Supreme Allied Commanders as the Mongolian People's Army and partisans of the Chinese Northeast Anti-Japanese United Army and Korean People's Revolutionary Army were incorporated into their order of battle for the liberation of Northern China, Northeastern China and northern Korea from Japanese imperialist occupation.

Cold War-era to present-day titles

The term came into use again with the formation of NATO in 1949. In 1952, Allied Command Europe was established, led by Eisenhower. He became the Supreme Allied Commander (SACEUR). Soon afterwards, Allied Command Atlantic was established, at Norfolk, Virginia, under Lynde McCormick, a U.S. Navy admiral. His title was Supreme Allied Commander Atlantic (SACLANT), and the entire command was usually known as SACLANT. Both Supreme Commanders have, until 2009, been American, with a deputy commander from another NATO member, though only British and Germans have held the post.

Responding to the establishment of NATO, the Warsaw Pact was established in 1955 along with their own posts of United Armed Forces Supreme Commander and Chief of Combined Staff. Until the disbandment of the Warsaw Pact in 1991, both posts had always been held by a Marshal of the Soviet Union or Army General due to their expertise in commanding and coordinating forces of enormous sizes in the Soviet Armed Forces.

In June 2003, the commands were reshuffled. One command was given responsibility for operations, and one for transforming the military components of the alliance to meet new challenges. In Europe, Allied Command Operations was established from the former Allied Command Europe, and given responsibility for all NATO military operations worldwide. However, for legal reasons, SACEUR retained the traditional title including Europe. In the United States, SACLANT was decommissioned and Allied Command Transformation established. The headquarters of ACT is at the former SACLANT headquarters in Norfolk, Virginia, USA. Each has a Supreme Allied Commander as its commander.

 Allied Command Operations (ACO) has its headquarters at Supreme Headquarters Allied Powers Europe (SHAPE), at Mons, Belgium. It is headed by the Supreme Allied Commander Europe (SACEUR), a U.S. four-star general or admiral also heading U.S. European Command. The current Commander is General Christopher G. Cavoli (Army), who succeeded General Tod Wolters (Air Force).
 Allied Command Transformation (ACT) is located in Norfolk, Virginia, USA. It is headed by the Supreme Allied Commander Transformation (SACT), a four-star general or admiral. General Stéphane Abrial, the commander from 2009 until 2012, was the first non-American to hold a supreme commander role within NATO. Since then this position has been held by a French Air Force officer. The commander of the organization is currently General Philippe Lavigne.

See also
Supreme Headquarters Allied Expeditionary Force
Supreme Headquarters Allied Powers Europe

References

External links
ACO/SHAPE homepage
ACT homepage

Allied commands of World War II
Positions of authority